814 Tauris (prov. designation:  or ) is a dark and very large background asteroid, approximately  in diameter, located the outer regions of the asteroid belt. It was discovered on 2 January 1916, by astronomer Russian Grigory Neujmin at the Simeiz Observatory on Crimea. The carbonaceous C-type asteroid has a longer-than average rotation period of 35.8 hours. It was named after the ancient name of the Crimean peninsula where the discovering observatory is located.

Orbit and classification 

Tauris is a non-family asteroid of the main belt's background population when applying the hierarchical clustering method to its proper orbital elements. It orbits the Sun in the outer main-belt at a distance of 2.2–4.1 AU once every 5 years and 7 months (2,048 days; semi-major axis of 3.16 AU). Its orbit has a notably high eccentricity of 0.31 and an inclination of 22° with respect to the ecliptic. This gives it a TJupiter of 3.0250, near the boundary of 3, which separates asteroids (above 3) from the Jupiter-family comets (below 3). The body's observation arc begins at Heidelberg Observatory on 30 January 1916, or four weeks after its official discovery observation at Simeiz Observatory.

Naming 

This minor planet was named after the ancient name of the Crimean peninsula, Tauris. Lutz Schmadel, the author of the Dictionary of Minor Planet Names also mentions a mountain with the same name on the southwest coast of Crimea. In addition, Baltic German astronomer Ludwig von Struve (1858–1920) also taught astronomy at the Tavrida University (Tauris University) in Simferopol, a large city on the Crimean peninsula (R. Bremer). The  was also mentioned in The Names of the Minor Planets by Paul Herget in 1955.

Physical characteristics 

In the Tholen classification as well in the Bus–Binzel SMASS classification, Tauris is a common, carbonaceous C-type asteroid, while in both the Tholen- and SMASS-like taxonomy of the Small Solar System Objects Spectroscopic Survey (S3OS2), it is an X-type asteroid.

Rotation period 

In 1983, a rotational lightcurve of Tauris, obtained from photometric observations with the ESO 0.5-metre telescope at La Silla, Chile, was by published by Belgian astronomer Henri Debehogne in collaboration with Italian astronomers Giovanni de Sanctis and Vincenzo Zappalà. Lightcurve analysis gave a rotation period of  hours with a brightness variation of  magnitude. In May 2013, Michael S. Alkema at the Elephant Head Observatory  in Arizona determined an identical period of  hours with an amplitude of  magnitude.

Diameter and albedo 

The Collaborative Asteroid Lightcurve Link adopts the results obtained by IRAS, that is, an albedo of 0.0470 and a diameter of 109.56 kilometers based on an absolute magnitude of 8.74.

Several asteroid occultations of Tauris were observed between 1999 and 2015. These timed observations are taken when the asteroid passes in front of a distant star. However, these two observations still received a relatively poor quality rating.

References

External links 
 Lightcurve Database Query (LCDB), at www.minorplanet.info
 Dictionary of Minor Planet Names, Google books
 Discovery Circumstances: Numbered Minor Planets (1)-(5000) – Minor Planet Center
 
 

000814
Discoveries by Grigory Neujmin
Named minor planets
000814
000814
19160102